Pagli Gewog is a former gewog (village block) of Samtse District, Bhutan.

References

Former gewogs of Bhutan
Samtse District